Laeticia Amihere (born July 10, 2001) is a Canadian college basketball player for the South Carolina Gamecocks of the Southeastern Conference (SEC).

Career
Amihere has won gold at the 2015 FIBA Americas Under-16 Championship for Women as part of the junior team, and then bronze at the 2017 FIBA Under-19 Women's Basketball World Cup. Amihere is currently playing with the South Carolina Gamecocks women's basketball team.

In July 2021, Amihere was named to Canada's 2020 Olympic team.

On April 3, 2022, Amihere became an NCAA national champion. The South Carolina Gamecocks beat the University of Connecticut to win their second national title, the first since 2017, with a score of 64 to 49.

References

2001 births
Living people
Basketball people from Ontario
Canadian women's basketball players
Sportspeople from Mississauga
Canadian expatriate basketball people in the United States
South Carolina Gamecocks women's basketball players
Black Canadian basketball players
Basketball players at the 2020 Summer Olympics
Olympic basketball players of Canada